So You Think You Can Dance is an American reality television program and dance competition airing on the Fox network. Season three premiered May 24, 2007.

Cat Deeley returned for her second consecutive season as host. Nigel Lythgoe returned as a permanent judge, joined this season by choreographer Mary Murphy. The remaining third—and during Vegas Week, fourth—judging spot was filled by a guest judge (see main article).

Auditions
Open auditions were held in the following locations:

Vegas week
As in the previous season, those making the cut moved on to an intensive week of dance training in Las Vegas, Nevada. This season, Vegas week included hip-hop choreography taught by Shane Sparks, samba choreography taught by Mary Murphy with assistance from season two finalist Dmitry Chaplin, and contemporary choreography taught by Mia Michaels. The contestants that survived the cuts following those rounds were divided into groups, asked to randomly select from a box a CD containing one of five possible music types, and choreograph a routine to the song on their chosen disk. The dancers remaining after the group choreography round were asked to perform one last solo, following which the group was whittled down to 34 contestants—17 male, 17 female. From this 34, the judges chose their top 20.

Finals

Format
As in season 2, the finals began with 20 contestants, ten male and ten female. After partners are assigned, couples pick a dance style out of a hat, are rehearsed by a choreographer, and perform their routine, which is taped two days prior to airing. Following the airing of the performances, home viewers vote for their favorite couple. The bottom three couples (six dancers overall) are then liable for elimination by the judges on the live, or broadcast on tape delay in the western United States, results show. All six dancers perform a solo, after which the judges eliminate one male and one female contestant. If the eliminated dancers are not from the same couple, their respective partners form a new pair for the following week's performances. Once the field of dancers is narrowed down to the top 10, permanent partnerships dissolve and contestants draw their new partners from a hat each week. The judges no longer have any say in the elimination process; viewers call in to vote for their favorite individual dancer, and the male and female with the lowest number of votes are eliminated each week.

Recurring theme
Mary Murphy's loud, high pitched scream, reserved for performances she liked best, made a reappearance this season, along with the added element of the "hot tamale train", which can make the viewers have the ability to keep dancers safe from elimination. On the first performance show, Murphy enjoyed Anya Garnis and Danny Tidwell's jive performance so much, she made a metaphor of a "hot tamale train" having "just pulled up and let Anya off the train, special delivery." Two weeks later, she gave Sabra Johnson and Dominic Sandoval "two tickets on the hot tamale train" for their outstanding rumba performance. The phrase was regularly referred to by Murphy throughout the rest of the season, sometimes with an added distinction of being in "first class" for truly extraordinary routines. On the week before the final performance show, she brought the metaphor to a close by noting that the "hot tamale train was entering finale station."

Controversy
The sixth week of competition marked controversy surrounding Emmy-nominated choreographers Wade Robson and Mia Michaels.

The controversy regarding Wade Robson was due to the anti-war solo routine he created for the top 10 contestants. His choreography was meant to be a dance promoting peace, but was considered by some viewers as a political statement against the Iraq War. The dancers wore T-shirts on which they painted words of their own choosing, such as "compassion", "understanding", "unity", and "peace." The following night, Nigel Lythgoe addressed the controversy by stating that the choreography was not in any way meant to be against the troops fighting in the war. He did not wish anyone to be offended by a routine that had words such as "peace" and "compassion" in it. To make light of the moment, Lythgoe joked that he was more upset to have seen the same routine ten times.

The controversy surrounding Mia Michaels was regarding a jacket she wore during the performance show. The garment was a United States Marine Corps Blue Dress jacket with red piping, which only enlisted Marines are able to wear. In addition, a Marine Corps rank insignia was sewn upside-down and in the wrong location on the sleeve. Michaels addressed this by apologizing and stating that a friend of hers had given her the jacket, and that she wore it as a fashion statement, noting that she had no idea of its tradition or that it would offend anyone.

Top 20 Contestants

Female Contestants

Male Contestants

Elimination chart
The song played for the females' elimination was Ryan Cabrera's "I Will Remember You".  The song played for the males' elimination was Audio Adrenaline's "Goodbye".

Contestants are in reverse chronological order of elimination.

¹ Because Jessi Peralta was unable to participate in the performance show, she had to perform a solo despite not technically being in the bottom three couples.

² Because Fox aired NFL coverage during the regular Thursday time slot, the results broadcast was pre-recorded and moved to the following Monday. In order to keep the results from leaking before the airing, the audience and nonessential crew were asked to leave the studio, which was locked down, before eliminations were announced.

Performances

Week 1 (June 13, 2007)
Judges: Nigel Lythgoe, Mary Murphy and Dan Karaty
Couple dances:

Week 2 (June 20, 2007)
Judges: Nigel Lythgoe, Mary Murphy and Mia Michaels
Couple dances:

Week 3 (June 27, 2007)
Judges: Nigel Lythgoe, Mary Murphy and Debbie Allen
Couple dances:

¹ Jessi Peralta was unable to participate in the performance show because she was undergoing medical treatment at the time. Melanie LaPatin danced the Cha-Cha with Pasha instead of Peralta, and only Pasha was credited with the votes for the performance. Peralta was required to perform a solo on the results show, which she was able to do, and was eliminated at that time.

Week 4 (July 11, 2007)
Judges: Nigel Lythgoe, Mary Murphy and Adam Shankman
Couple dances:

Week 5 (July 18, 2007)
Judges: Nigel Lythgoe, Mary Murphy and Wade Robson
Couple dances:

Week 6 (July 25, 2007)
Judges: Nigel Lythgoe, Mary Murphy and Mia Michaels
Couple dances:

* All of the dancers also performed the same, pro-peace themed, solo routine to John Mayer's "Waiting on the World to Change", choreographed by Wade Robson.

Week 7 (August 1, 2007)
Judges: Nigel Lythgoe, Mary Murphy and Adam Shankman
Couple dances:

Week 8 (August 8, 2007)
Judges: Nigel Lythgoe, Mary Murphy and Debbie Allen
Couple dances:

Solos:

Week 9 (August 15, 2007)
Judges: Nigel Lythgoe, Mary Murphy and Dan Karaty

Group dance: Top 4: "Mein Herr" from Cabaret (Broadway; Choreographer: Tyce Diorio)
Couple dances:

Solos:

Results shows

Week 1 (June 14, 2007)
Group dance: Top 20: "Put Your Hands Where My Eyes Could See"—Busta Rhymes (Pop-Jazz; Choreographer: Wade Robson)
Guest dancer: Benji Schwimmer: "Tu vuò fà l'americano" from The Talented Mr. Ripley (West Coast Swing)
Musical guest: "Get It Shawty"—Lloyd
Solos:

Eliminated:
Ashlee Langas
Ricky Palomino
New partners:
None

Week 2 (June 21, 2007)
Group dance: Top 18: "It Was All In Your Mind"—Wade Robson (Hip-Hop; Choreographer: Shane Sparks)
Musical guest: "Impacto"—Daddy Yankee
Solos:

Eliminated:
Faina Savich
Jimmy Arguello
New partners:
Cedric Gardner and Shauna Noland

Week 3 (June 28, 2007)
Group dance: Top 16: "The Lioness Hunt" from The Lion King (African Jazz; Choreographer: Tyce Diorio)
Special performance: Pasha Kovalev and Jessi Peralta performed the cha cha routine they were unable to originally exhibit due to Peralta's medical issues
Musical guest: "Glamorous"—Fergie feat. Ludacris
Solos:

Eliminated:
Jessi Peralta
Jesús Solario
New partners:
Pasha Kovalev and Sara Von Gillern

Week 4 (July 12, 2007)
Group dance: Top 14: "You Can't Stop The Beat" from Hairspray (Broadway; Choreographer: Adam Shankman)
Musical guest:  "Stranger"—Hilary Duff
Solos:

Eliminated:
Cedric Gardner
Shauna Noland
New partners:
None

Week 5 (July 19, 2007)
Group dance: Top 12: "Boogie Woogie Bugle Boy"—Cami Thompson (Jive; Choreographer: Jean-Marc Généreux)
Guest dancer: Jason Samuel Smith (Tap)
Musical guest:  "Somebody's Me"—Enrique Iglesias
Solos:

Eliminated:
Anya Garnis
Hokuto Konishi
New partners:
 None. Now that only the top ten remain, new partners are randomly assigned each week, and they'll be voted individually.

Week 6 (July 26, 2007)
Group dance: Top 10: "The Moment I Said It"—Imogen Heap (Contemporary; Choreographer: Mia Michaels)
Musical guest: "Love Today"—Mika
Solos:

Eliminated:
Jaimie Goodwin
Kameron Bink

Week 7 (August 2, 2007)
Group dance: Top 8: "Get Up"—Ciara feat. Chamillionaire (Hip-Hop; Choreographer: Shane Sparks)
Musical guest: "Apologize"— OneRepublic
Solos:

Eliminated:
 Sara Von Gillern
 Dominic “D-Trix” Sandoval

Week 8 (August 13, 2007)
Group dance: "2:19"—Tom Waits (Pop-Jazz; Choreographer: Wade Robson)
Special Performances:
Titus Fotso: African Dance Music Ensemble (African jazz)
Lil' C and the Neph Squad: "Nephz Up"—The J Squad (Krump)
Solos:

Eliminated:
Lauren Gottlieb
Pasha Kovalev

Week 9 (Grand Finale) (August 16, 2007)
Judges Nigel Lythgoe, Mary Murphy, Dan Karaty, Wade Robson, Shane Sparks and Mia Michaels
Group dances:

Guest dancers:

Musical guests:
"Whatever U Like"—Nicole Scherzinger
"I Will Remember You"—Ryan Cabrera
Judges' picks:

4th Place
Lacey Schwimmer
3rd Place
Neil Haskell
Runner-Up
Danny Tidwell
Winner
Sabra Johnson

Other

Live tour
As in season 2, the top 10 contestants embarked on a live tour of the United States. Due to the success of the previous tour, this season's engagement was extended to 10 weeks and visited 50 cities. Tickets went on sale 11 August. On the season finale, Hokuto Konishi, Shauna Noland, Anya Garnis, and Jesús Solorio were named as alternate performers in the event of injury to any of the top 10. Noland, Garnis, and Jaimie Goodwin had been replacing Lacey Schwimmer in some of her tour routines because of an injury to her meniscus.

Awards

2008 Emmy Awards

Broadcast outside of the United States
Australia is currently the only country outside of the United States that airs So You Think You Can Dance on Network Ten which premiered on 27 September 2007. Before the show was aired, commercials were shown with Cat Deeley wearing the same blue dress she wore on the 19 September result show with long earrings and her hair tied back, started to broadcast the show to the Australian audience saying "Coming on Ten". Other footage that was shown included Nigel Lythgoe doing a little dance and wearing the same suit on that result show. During the show with the top 20, after the last couple danced, Cat Deeley (still wearing the same dress on the 19th of September's result show) says "Will your favourite dancer make it through to the next round? Don't go anywhere Australia (Deeley doing a little head shake), because the result show is coming up right after this break". During this time, Australia started to do auditions for So You Think You Can Dance Australia. It has been discovered by fans of the show that Channel 10 has been showing a heavily edited version of SYTYCD Season 3, with the audition shows compressed into two episodes and even leaving whole dances out of some of the finals shows (e.g.  The Paso Doble to We Will Rock You By Sara and Jesús).

The series is currently shown on DSTV Channel 104 across Africa. It finished on 22 November 2007.

It is also being shown in Canada on Muchmusic.

In the Middle East, it is being shown on MBC 4. It premiered on 24 October.

It is also shown on the Fox network in Japan without any editing with the performance and elimination round being shown on the same night.  Following the show, Japanese amateur dancers are also shown, usually 4 dancers per week.  It is currently showing the top 12 dancers as of 2007 December 30.

SYTYCD is also currently being shown in the UK on LivingTV every Wednesday at 8pm and is repeated throughout the week.

SYTYCD was also being broadcast in India on AXN every Tuesday at 9pm.

In Singapore, the show is currently aired on MediaCorp TV Channel 5.

In Hong Kong, it is also currently airing on TVB Pearl, at Saturday nights on 8:30pm.

It is also shown in the Philippines in the velvet channel, velvet channel airs different reality shows all over the world mostly from the United States.

In Norway, the showed the season at TVNorge.

In Latin America, the show is aired on People & Arts, cable TV.

Ratings

U.S. Nielsen ratings

See also
 List of So You Think You Can Dance finalists

Notes

References

External links
 Official "So You Think You Can Dance" Website
 

2007 American television seasons
Season 03